Shwetkali is Bengali Thriller Drama web-series starring Oindrilla Sen, Sourav Chakraborty, Saheb Bhattacharya, Arindam Ganguly, Debdut Ghosh, Devlina Kumar, Samadarshi Dutta, Swagata Basu and Rishi Koushik. It was created and directed by Sani Ghosh Ray. The show marks Oindrilla Sen's debut on a digital platform.

The series is scheduled to premiere on ZEE5 on 24 February 2023.

Plot 
Shwetkali follows the story of Urvi and Palash and their families after the reach the Kharapani Mansion to celebrate their engagement. In middle of the celebrations, a wall in the mansion breaks down revealing a hidden statue of white Kali, also referred to as Shwet Kali. Following this an number of incident unravel that hark back to a dark past and how they have an implication on the present.

Cast 
Oindrilla Sen
Sourav Chakraborty 
Saheb Bhattacharya
Arindam Ganguly
Debdut Ghosh
Devlina Kumar
Samadarshi Dutta
Swagata Basu
Rishi Kaushik

Marketing 
The show was announced as a part its future slate of Bengali shows by ZEE5 on December 12, 2022. The trailer of Shwetkali was released on February 12, 2023. As a part of the promotions, Oindrilla Sen was seen in a Mahashivratri special episode of popular Bengali TV show Gouri Elo.

References

External links 
 
 Shwetkali Trailer on Youtube
 Shwetkali on ZEE5

Indian web series
Thriller web series
2023 Indian television series debuts
ZEE5 original programming
Indian thriller television series